Competitor for  Canada

Mildred Fizzell (June 12, 1915 – November 11, 1993) was a Canadian athlete who competed mainly in the 100 metres.  Mildred Fizzell is commonly listed erroneously as Mildred Frizzel in many record books.

Born in Toronto, Ontario, Fizzell competed for Canada in the 1932 Summer Olympics held in Los Angeles, United States in the 4 x 100 metres where she won the Silver medal with her teammates Lillian Palmer, Mary Frizzell and Hilda Strike.  Mildred's father drove the team to the Games in Los Angeles.

The team believed that they tied with the team from the United States.  However, with the lack of modern equipment to determine a tie, the United States team was awarded the win.  In many record books the two teams are listed with the same times.

Famous for her explosive start, Mildred Fizzell was sent to the 1932 Olympics in the 4x100 metre relay only.  She would have competed at the 1936 games in both relay and 100 metre sprint; however, before the 1934 British Empire Games (now known as the Commonwealth games) she tore a muscle after arriving in London and was unable to participate. She never completely recovered from this injury and was forced to retire from athletics soon thereafter.

She later married Alfred Walker and had 3 daughters and 10 grandchildren. She died in Toronto, Ontario.

1915 births
1993 deaths
Canadian female sprinters
Athletes from Toronto
Athletes (track and field) at the 1932 Summer Olympics
Olympic silver medalists for Canada
Olympic track and field athletes of Canada
Medalists at the 1932 Summer Olympics
Olympic silver medalists in athletics (track and field)
Olympic female sprinters